The Bolshoy Patom, "Big Patom", is a river in Irkutsk Oblast, Russia.

Bolshoy Patom village is located by the riverbank in its lower course. Tourists visit the Bolshoy Patom river mainly for rafting and kayaking. In the International scale of river difficulty the Bolshoy Patom is a Class III and IV river. There are picturesque white limestone cliffs flanking a number of stretches of the Bolshoy Patom.

Course  
The Bolshoy Patom is a right tributary of the Lena. The river flows first in an approximately western direction across the highland area within a gorge cut into the plateau bedrock. Near the slopes of the northern end of the Kropotkin Range it bends and flows roughly northwards with many rapids. Then it bends slightly and flows northeastwards parallel to the Lena that skirts the highlands further to the west.
The area named "Forty Islands" (Сорок Островов) is located near ​​the confluence of the Satalakh,  from the mouth, where the river splits into channels, forming islands in between.

In its last major bend, the Bolshoy Patom heads eastwards. The river channel widens and the flow slows down in its last  stretch across a wide floodplain.
Finally the Bolshoy Patom meets the right bank of the Lena near at the border of the Sakha Republic (Yakutia),  from its mouth. The town of Macha lies just a few miles downstream from the confluence.

The largest are the Bolshaya Taimendra, Cheloichen, Tonoda and Khaverga from the right; and the Tamper and Muoda from the left. During spring floods it may overflow its banks and flood surrounding areas.
The river freezes between October and May. In its last stretch the Bolshoy Patom is navigable during the high-water period of the year.

See also
List of rivers of Russia

References

External links 
Река Большой Патом
Большой-Патом (winter)
р.Большой-Патом

Rivers of Irkutsk Oblast